Wesley House is a seminary in Cambridge.

Wesley House may also refer to:

Australia 

Wesley House, an Australian theological institution at, or renamed as, Wesley Theological College

United Kingdom 

Charles Wesley's House, an 18th-century house in Bristol
John Wesley's House, an 18th-century house adjacent to Wesley's Chapel in London
Wesley House, Leatherhead, the 20th-century former offices of Leatherhead Urban District Council

United States 

William S. Simmons Plantation, also known as Wesley House, listed on the National Register of Historic Places (NRHP) in Georgia
Wesley House (Houma, Louisiana), listed on the NRHP in Louisiana
Wesley House in Eden Gardens State Park, Florida